"Bo Peep Bo Peep" is a song by South Korean girl group T-ara. It is the first lead track (of two) from the album Absolute First Album, the other being "Like The First Time" (Korean: 처음처럼). The song won 5 weekly number one awards on KBS Music Bank and SBS Inkigayo. It was later re-recorded in Japanese for the group's debut single, which was released on September 28, 2011. They are the first Korean group to debut at the number one spot in both Oricon's weekly chart and Billboard Japan Hot 100. The single has sold a total of more than 91,343 copies to date and was certified Gold for a shipment of over 100,000 paid downloads by the RIAJ.

History
For the group's comeback, T-ara released music video teasers for the songs "Bo Peep Bo Peep" and "Like the First Time". Around 9,000 netizens from over 9 music portal sites voted in a poll determining which song will become the album's title track, but despite "Like the First Time" being the winning song and lead track to the album, the group promoted "Bo Peep Bo Peep" on music programs after it was well received by critics who felt that it would be the group's first hit. The group held their comeback stage on KBS Music Bank on December 4.

Japanese version
On August 4, 2011, it was announced that T-ara would be debuting in Japan with a Japanese version of "Bo Peep Bo Peep". The single was released on September 28 as two limited editions and a regular edition, with a Japanese version of their song "I Go Crazy Because of You" as the accompanying b-side. The music video was released on September 1 on the Japanese cable television network Space Shower TV. The single debuted on Oricon's Daily Chart at No. 1 with 20,068 copies sold on the first day. They are the first Korean girl group to achieve the number one spot and the third Korean group to reach the top three of the charts after MBLAQ's "Your Luv" and SHINee's "Replay-Kimi wa Boku no Everything". The single debuted at number one on Oricon's Weekly Chart with 49,712 copies sold and number one on Billboard Japan Hot 100, making them the first foreign group and also the first Korean girl group to debut at number one. The single ended up on "2011 iTunes (Japan) Rewind" Top 100 singles of the year at 86.

Cover versions
In 2010, Taiwanese entertainer  (王彩樺) did a cover of the song under the title "Bobee 保庇". It became a dance craze and was picked by CNN's Phil Han for the "Best Viral Video of the Week", which led to controversy from Korean netizens complaining that the song 'wasn't original' and that they failed to mention the original title or T-ara's name at all.

In popular culture 
In 2012, Captain Kim Hang-ah (Played by Ha Ji-won) danced to "Bo Peep Bo Peep" on the 7th episode of the drama "The King 2 Hearts". On April 12, 2012, Ha Ji-Won revealed she was the choreography personally by the song's choreographer Jeon Hong-bok. The actress was praised for her dancing skills, However, on screen she had to give off the image that her character cannot dance well, and "that made it even more difficult".

Accolades

Awards and nominations

Music show awards

Rankings

Track listing

Charts

Weekly charts

Year-end charts

Sales and certifications

Release history

References

2009 singles
2011 singles
T-ara songs
Oricon Weekly number-one singles
Billboard Japan Hot 100 number-one singles
Korean-language songs
Japanese-language songs
Songs written by Shinsadong Tiger
Song recordings produced by Shinsadong Tiger
2009 songs
Kakao M singles

ko:Absolute First Album#Bo Peep Bo Peep